"Bitters End" is the final song on Roxy Music's self-titled  debut album, released in 1972.
The song is based on a group vocal arrangement done in a satirical 1950s doo wop style. "Bitters End" was not performed live often, however Roxy Music did perform it on 23 June 1972 for John Peel on the BBC sessions.

A cover version of this song is on the Velvet Goldmine soundtrack, performed by Andy Mackay and Paul Kimble.

Song Musicians
 Bryan Ferry – lead vocals, piano
 Andy MacKay – backing vocals, saxophone
 Brian Eno – backing vocals
 Graham Simpson – bass guitar
 Paul Thompson – percussion

Roxy Music songs
1972 songs
Songs written by Bryan Ferry